Anton Hedman (born 15 May 1986) is a former  Swedish professional ice hockey player (winger), who played for Djurgårdens IF of the Swedish Hockey League (SHL).He was drafted as 255th overall by the Boston Bruins in the 2004 NHL Entry Draft.

His youth team was Tranebergs IF. He has previously played in the SHL with Modo Hockey, Luleå HF, Färjestad BK and Örebro HK.

On 10 May 2019, Hedman agreed to one-year contract with former junior club, Djurgårdens IF of the SHL.

Career statistics

References

External links

1986 births
Living people
Almtuna IS players
Boston Bruins draft picks
Djurgårdens IF Hockey players
Färjestad BK players
Guelph Storm players
Hammarby Hockey (1921–2008) players
Luleå HF players
Modo Hockey players
Örebro HK players
Owen Sound Attack players
Sudbury Wolves players
Swedish ice hockey forwards
Växjö Lakers players
VIK Västerås HK players
Ice hockey people from Stockholm